The following is a discography of production by Kane Beatz.

Singles produced

2006

Trick Daddy - Back by Thug Demand 
 07. "Tuck Ya Ice" (feat. Birdman)
 11. "Lights Off" (feat. International Jones)

Lil' Scrappy - Bred 2 Die - Born 2 Live 
 03. "Young & Famous" (feat. Stay Fresh)
 11. "The Situation" (feat. Nook)

2007

DJ Khaled - We the Best 
 09. "S on My Chest" (feat. Lil Wayne & Birdman)

Chamillionaire - Ultimate Victory 
 01. "The Morning News"
 03. "Standing Ovation"
 04. "Won't Let You Down" (feat. KC)
 13. "The Evening News"
 14. "Welcome to the South" (feat. Pimp C)

Brisco 
 00. "In The Hood" (feat. Lil Wayne)

Birdman - 5 * Stunna 
 02. "Fully Loaded"
 23. "S on My Chest" (feat. Lil Wayne) (iTunes bonus track)

2008

Flo Rida - Mail on Sunday 
 08. "Still Missin'"
 Sample Credit: "Jazzy Belle" by Outkast

Plies - Definition of Real 
 16. "Thug Section" (Best Buy bonus track)

Big Kuntry King - My Turn to Eat 
 07. "Love You the Right Way" (feat. Lloyd)

2009

B.G. - Too Hood 2 Be Hollywood 
 00. "I Rather Die" (feat. 2Pac)
 00. "I Rather Die (Remix)" (feat. Maino & 2Pac)

Gorilla Zoe - Don't Feed da Animals 
 01. "Untamed Gorilla" (feat. JC)

Lil Scrappy - The Grustle 
 00. "Thug It To The Bone" (feat. Trey Songz)
 00. "Livin' The Life" (feat. Razah)

Young Money - We Are Young Money 
 04. "Wife Beater"
 09. "Bedrock" (feat. Lloyd)
 11. "Steady Mobbin'" (feat. Gucci Mane)
 13. "She Is Gone"

2010

Yelawolf - Trunk Muzik 
 12. "Mixin' Up the Medicine (Remix)" (feat. Juelz Santana)

Diggy Simmons - Airborne 
 10. "You Got Me Now" (feat. Jacob Latimore)

Trey Songz - Passion, Pain & Pleasure 
 05. "Bottoms Up" (feat. Nicki Minaj)
 17. "You Just Need Me" (produced with J-Mike)

Lil Wayne - I Am Not a Human Being 
 01. "Gonorrhea" (feat. Drake)
 07. "Right Above It" (feat. Drake)

Nicki Minaj - Pink Friday 
 01. "I'm the Best"
 11. "Dear Old Nicki"
 14. "Super Bass" (Deluxe edition bonus tracks) 
 20. "Bedrock" (Young Money feat. Lloyd) (Japan bonus tracks)

Bei Maejor - Upside Down 2 
 05. "Wife U Up"

Rick Ross - The Albert Anastasia EP 
 07. "All I Need" (feat. Birdman & Trey Songz)

Slick Pulla - The Bobby Drake Chronicles 
 09. "All About Money" (feat. Magazeen, 211, Swazy Baby & DJ Bigga Rankin')

2011

Sean Kingston - King of Kingz 
 09. "One Way"

Lupe Fiasco - Lasers 
 06. "The Show Goes On"
 Sample Credit: "Float On" by Modest Mouse

Ace Hood - Body Bag Vol.1 
 04. "Try'n (feat. T-Pain)"

New Boyz - Too Cool to Care 
 04. "I Don't Care" (feat. Big Sean) (produced with Roahn “First Born” Hylton)
 08. "Zonin'" (produced with J-Mike)
 10. "Can’t Nobody" (feat. Shanell)
 16. "Beautiful Dancer" (feat. Charlie Wilson) (produced with Diplo) (Deluxe Edition)

Yo Gotti - CM6: Gangsta of the Year 
 10. "What It Iz Homie"
 15. "100" (feat. Zed Zilla & Sylver Karatz)"
 18. "On Everything"

Roscoe Dash - Dash Effect 
 11. "Keep Em Coming"
 31. "Good Good Night"

2012

Nicki Minaj - Pink Friday: Roman Reloaded 
 18. "Gun Shot" (feat. Beenie Man)

Slaughterhouse - Welcome to: Our House
 14. "Park It Sideways"
 20. "Place to Be" (feat. B.o.B)

T. Mills - Thrillionaire 
 05. "Busy Bitch"

DJ Drama - Quality Street Music 
 04. "We in This Bitch"(feat. Young Jeezy, T.I., Ludacris & Future)
 15. "We in This Bitch 1.5" (feat. Drake & Future)

Meek Mill - Dreams and Nightmares 
 09. "Lay Up" (feat. Wale, Rick Ross, & Trey Songz)

2013

Alley Boy - War Cry
 00. "Icey" (leftover track)

Fat Trel - SDMG 
 17. "Kalifornia Living"

2014

G-Eazy - These Things Happen
 00. "The Day It All Changed" (leftover track) (produced with LUCA)

Wiz Khalifa - Blacc Hollywood
 13. "True Colors" (feat. Nicki Minaj)

August Alsina - Testimony 
 00. "Like a Star" (leftover track)

Nicki Minaj - The Pinkprint 
 15. "Bed of Lies" (feat. Skylar Grey)
 16. "Grand Piano"

Lil Bibby - Free Crack 2 
12. "What You Live For"

2015

Casey Veggies - Live & Grow
 00. "Tied Up" (feat. DeJ Loaf) (produced with LUCA)

Lil Boosie
 13. "All I Know" (feat. PJ) (produced with JMike)

Lil Wayne - "Free Weezy Album"
 2. "He's Dead"

G-Eazy - "When It's Dark Out"
 17. "Nothing To Me" (feat. E-40 & Keyshia Cole) (Produced with TODAY)

2016

Yo Gotti - "The Art of Hustle"
 05. "The Art of Hustle"

Flo Rida - "Single"
 17. "Hello Friday" (feat. Jason DeRulo) (produced with TODAY)

Upcoming

Birdman - Bigga Than Life 
 00. "Loyalty" (feat. Lil Wayne & Tyga)

Mike Posner - Pages 
 00. "Living My Life" (feat. 2 Chainz)

External links
 at Discogs
Allmusic credits

References 

Hip hop discographies
Production discographies
 
 
Discographies of American artists